Mechthild of Schwarzburg-Käfernburg (d. 1192), was a countess consort of Holstein by marriage to Adolf II of Holstein. She was the regent of Pomerania during the minority of her son Adolf III of Holstein between 1164 and 1174. 

She was born to Count Sizzo III of Schwarzburg-Käfernburg.

References

12th-century women rulers
12th-century German women
1192 deaths